William Harrison Jr. (c. 1750 – July 21, 1789) was an American planter from Charles County, Maryland. He was a delegate for Maryland in the Continental Congress of 1786 and 1787.

Harrison was an active revolutionary in Charles County. He served in the local militia, and as a representative in 1775 to the state’s revolutionary assembly, the Annapolis Convention. In 1778 he was named as a justice of the peace for Charles County, and reappointed regularly until 1785.

External links

1789 deaths
Continental Congressmen from Maryland
18th-century American politicians
Maryland militiamen in the American Revolution
Year of birth uncertain